Kentucky Route 344 (KY 344) is a  state highway in the U.S. state of Kentucky. The highway travels through mostly rural areas of Fleming and Lewis counties

Route description

Fleming County
KY 344 begins at an intersection with KY 57 northeast of Mount Carmel, within Fleming County. It travels to the northeast and curves to the southeast. It crosses over Trotters Creek and passes Foxport Cemetery before it enters Pleasureville, where it intersects the southern terminus of KY 989. It enters Foxport, where it intersects the northern terminus of KY 1902 (Pleasant Valley Road). It then crosses over the North Fork Licking River. Just after this bridge, it marks the Lewis County line.

Lewis County
KY 344 crosses over the North Fork Licking River and curves to the east-northeast. The highway curves to the south-southeast and crosses over Mud Lick Branch. It intersects the southern terminus of KY 3310 (Toller Bridge Road), passes Esham Cemetery, and then begins paralleling Dunaway Branch. It curves to the east-southeast and enters Petersville, where it intersects the eastern terminus of KY 559, curves to the northeast, leaves Dunaway Branch, and begins paralleling Kinniconick Creek. The highway crosses over Rock Camp Branch. It then crosses over Paint Lick Branch, curves to the east-northeast, and crosses over Burnt Cabin Branch. It travels through Crum and passes McEldowney Cemetery just before crossing over Black Lick Branch. It then crosses over Elk Lick, Long, Trumstock, and Bear branches before it curves to the east-southeast. The highway then has an intersection with the northern terminus of KY 377. It then curves to the north-northwest. KY 344 curves to the northeast and crosses over Holly Branch. It curves to the east-southeast and enters Kinniconick, where it meets its eastern terminus, an intersection with KY 59 (Fairlane Drive).

Major intersections

See also

References

0344
Transportation in Fleming County, Kentucky
Transportation in Lewis County, Kentucky